Alena Vasileŭna Pasechnik (born 17 April 1995) is a Belarusian athlete specialising in the shot put. She represented her country at the 2019 World Championships in Doha without reaching the final.

Her personal bests in the event are 18.01 metres outdoors (Minsk 2019) and 17.44 metres indoors (Mogilyov 2018).

International competitions

References

1995 births
Living people
Belarusian female shot putters
World Athletics Championships athletes for Belarus
Competitors at the 2019 Summer Universiade